Robert Dugan (born 10 August 1959) is an Australian former cricketer. He played five first-class matches for South Australia between 1978 and 1982.

See also
 List of South Australian representative cricketers

References

External links
 

1959 births
Living people
Australian cricketers
South Australia cricketers
People from Broken Hill, New South Wales
Cricketers from New South Wales